The Bukit Timah Expressway (BKE) is a highway in Singapore that starts at the Pan Island Expressway in Bukit Timah and travels north to the Woodlands Checkpoint and the Johor–Singapore Causeway in Woodlands.

History
On 22 May 1982, tenders were called to build the expressway and construction began thereafter. Construction of the expressway began in 1983 and it was built in two stages, the first stage from Woodlands to Mandai Road and the second from Mandai Road to the Pan-Island Expressway. Due to the hilly nature of the Bukit Timah area the second stage of the expressway went through, explosives were used to clear the area for construction. During the construction, the new road, Bukit Panjang Road was opened from BKE all the way to Woodlands Road, and new interchanges at Mandai Road and Woodlands Road were also added as well. Kampong roads were demolished such as Jalan Kwok Min, Lorong Kingkit and Lorong Garpu. The small section of Jalan Kwok Min remains and Singapore Armed Forces took over the Jalan Kwok Min area since 1997. It was opened in December 1985.

This expressway is a six-lane dual carriageway, with three lanes on either side. In 2003, the LTA began work to convert a section of the expressway, from the intersection with the Kranji Expressway to that with the Seletar Expressway, into an eight-lane dual carriageway with four lanes on either side; This was completed in mid-2005.

List of exits

{| class="wikitable"
|-
! scope="col" | Exit
! scope="col" | Destinations
! scope="col" | Notes
|-
| 1
| Pan Island Expressway (PIE) (Changi Airport, Tuas)
| Southbound terminus; PIE Exit 24
|-
| 2
| Dairy Farm Road
|
|-
| 3
| Bukit Panjang Road
|
|-
| 5
| Kranji Expressway
| 
|-
| 7
| Mandai Road
|
|-
| 8
| Seletar Expressway, Turf Club Avenue
|
|- style="background: #ffdddd"
| 10A
| Woodlands Avenue 3
| Northbound exit and southbound entrance only
|- style="background: #dff9f9"
| 10B
| Woodlands Road, Woodlands Centre Road
| Northbound terminus; expressway continues as Johor–Singapore Causeway
|-

See also
 AH2

References

External links
 Traffic cameras monitoring the BKE
 LTA press release on the partial widening of the BKE

Expressways in Singapore
Central Water Catchment
Bukit Panjang
Sungei Kadut
Woodlands, Singapore